Wen Shizhen  (1877–1951), also known as S. T. Wen, was a politician and diplomat in the Republic of China. He was Mayor of Tianjin during the Provisional Government of the Republic of China and the Wang Jingwei regime (Republic of China-Nanjing). His courtesy name was Peishan. He was born in Tianjin.

Beijing government
Wen Shizhen graduated from the Beiyang Naval College in 1898. He served for 4 years in the Chinese Navy as a lieutenant while he went to the United Kingdom for training. Later he transferred to the staff of Li Hongzhang. In 1906 he was appointed a secretary for foreign affairs to the Viceroy of Liangguang.

In 1913 Wen Shizhen was appointed advisor in foreign affairs to the Military Governor (Dudu) Zhejiang. In 1916 he was given an additional post as High Diplomatic Advisor to the Military Governor Jiangxi Li Chun. In August 1917 Li Chun became Military Governor Jiangsu; Wen accompanied him. In October 1920 he was appointed Superintendent of Customs of Nanjing. The next month he became concurrently Commissioner of Foreign Affairs in Nanjing. The next year he became a member of the Chinese Delegation to the Washington Naval Conference as the honorary councilor.

In 1923 Wen Shizhen was treated as an ambassador extraordinary and plenipotentiary. With the Zhili clique's support, Wen was appointed Commissioner of Foreign Affairs and concurrently Superintendent of Customs of Shanghai in September 1924. That year the Zhili clique was beaten by the Fengtian clique in the Second Zhili–Fengtian War, and Wen was invited by the Fengtian clique's Military Governor Yang Yuting. Later the National Revolutionary Army occupied Shanghai, so Wen defected to Japan, and retired from political life for a while.

Collaboration with Japan 

In December 1937 Wang Kemin established the Provisional Government of the Republic of China. Wen also participated in it, and was appointed Superintendent of Customs of Tianjin, Inspector of the Bank of Hebei Province, and Chairperson of the Arranging Commission for tariffs, etc.

At that time Pan Yugui was appointed Mayor of Tianjin Special City. However, his birthplace was not Tianjin, so the leading figures of Tianjin and the Japanese Special Service Agency of Tianjin did not want to support him. While Wen Shizhen was born in Tianjin, his work was better than Pan's, so he won support with people in the political circle. Pan and Wen struggled with each other; in 1939, Pan resigned his post and Wen became the mayor. In March 1940 the Wang Jingwei regime was established, while Wen stayed at his post. In February 1943 he resigned Mayor.

After the surrender of Japan at the end of World War II, Wen was arrested by Chiang Kai-shek's National Government, and because of the charge of treason and surrender to the enemy (namely Hanjian), he was sentenced to death. However, Wen was not executed while he was imprisoned in Tianjin. At the end of 1948, because the People's Liberation Army's entering Tianjin was coming, Wen was released by the Kuomintang authority. The following January he was rearrested by the Tianjin People's Government, Communist Party of China.

Wen Shizhen was executed by the authority of the People's Republic of China in 1951.

Alma mater 

Beiyang Naval College

References

Footnotes 

 
 
 The Before and After of Pan Yugui was appointed to the Fake Mayor of Tianjin  The Official Website of Hebei Ward, Tianjin
 
 

1877 births
1951 deaths
Executed Chinese collaborators with Imperial Japan
Mayors of Tianjin
Republic of China politicians from Tianjin